Österreichs schlechtester Autofahrer   ("Austria's Worst Driver") is an Austrian television series.

See also
List of Austrian television series

2007 Austrian television series debuts
2007 Austrian television series endings
2000s Austrian television series
ORF (broadcaster)
German-language television shows